The 2005 Giro di Lombardia was the 99th edition of the cycling classic held on 15 October 2005, with Paolo Bettini winning the race.

General Standings

15 October 2005: Mendrisio – Como,

References

External links
Race website

2005
Giro di Lombardia
Giro di Lombardia
Giro di Lombardia
October 2005 sports events in Europe